The Basilica di Santa Maria Regina degli Apostoli alla Montagnola, entrusted to the care of the   Society of St. Paul (Paolini), is located in Via Antonino Pio, in the Ostiense quarter of the city of Rome, Italy.

History
Built between 1945 and 1954, the church was designed by architect Leone Favini and is inspired by Roman Baroque architecture. The plan of the church is marked exteriorly and interiorly by its large dome. The interior is notable for a series of frescoes by the artist G.A. Santagata, depicting Marian images, among them a fresco showing the Virgin Mary seated among the Apostles as the Holy Spirit descends upon them.

Cardinalatial Titular Church

Pope Paul VI established the church as a cardinalatial Titular Church on 25 February 1965.

The Cardinal priests who have been assigned to this title to date are:

Ermenegildo Florit, 25 February 1965 appointed-8 December 1985 died
Giuseppe Sensi, 22 June 1987 appointed-26 July 2001 died
Virgilio Noè, 22 February 2002 appointed-24 July 2011 died
John Tong Hon, 18 February 2012 appointed- present

Parish Church

On  October 26, 1976, the church was established as a parish church of the diocese of Rome by the decree Pastorali munere issued by the Cardinal Vicar, Ugo Poletti. In April 1984 the Holy See granted the church the dignity of a minor basilica.

The Pauline Family

The church was founded by Father Giacomo Alberione, founder of the Society of St. Paul, of the Daughters of St. Paul, and other religious institutes which form the Pauline Family. The church is attached to the Mother House of the Society of St. Paul.

In the church are the tombs of Blessed Giacomo Alberione, of Blessed Giuseppe Giaccardo (1896-1948), a priest of the  Society of St. Paul, and that  of Mother Thecla (Maria Teresa) Merlo (1894-1964), co-founder  of the  Daughters of St. Paul.

Despite the similar title, the church is unrelated to the Pontifical Athenaeum Regina Apostolorum, an educational institute in Rome directed by the Congregation of the Legionaries of Christ.

References

External links
Regina Apostolorum
Pope Paul VI establish it as titular church 

Titular churches
Rome Q. X Ostiense
20th-century Roman Catholic church buildings in Italy